José António dos Santos Silva (born 14 March 1977), known as Zé António, is a Portuguese former professional footballer who played as a central defender.

He amassed Primeira Liga totals of 175 games and ten goals over eight seasons, representing in the competition Alverca, Varzim, Académica and União de Leiria. He added 145 matches and 12 goals in the Segunda Liga, in a 21-year senior career.

Zé António also competed professionally in Germany, Turkey and Spain.

Club career
Born in Torres Vedras, Lisbon District, Zé António began playing football for hometown's S.C.U. Torreense, being acquired in 1998 by Primeira Liga club FC Porto. However, he never represented the latter officially, going on to have loan spells at Leça F.C. and F.C. Alverca and being definitively sold to Alverca in the summer of 2000.

After another top-level campaign, with Varzim SC (which ended in relegation), Zé António joined Académica de Coimbra and played there from 2003 to 2005, forming an interesting defensive partnership with Tonel – later of Sporting CP – in his first year.

Avoiding relegation with Académica at the end of 2004–05, Zé António took advantage of his outrunning contract to sign for Borussia Mönchengladbach in the Bundesliga, on a deal lasting for two initial seasons. An undisputed starter throughout the 2005–06 campaign he opened his goalscoring account in just his fourth league appearance with the Germans, heading the winner in a 2–1 home win over MSV Duisburg on 10 September.

Aged 29, Zé António received his first callup for the Portugal national team, being summoned by Luiz Felipe Scolari for UEFA Euro 2008 qualifiers against Azerbaijan and Poland. He eventually failed to earn a full cap, and Borussia also suffered relegation in 2007.

In January 2008, after having made no appearances in 2007–08 (division two), Zé António moved on loan to Turkey's Vestel Manisaspor for six months. At the end of June, he switched to Spain and signed a two-year contract with La Liga side Racing de Santander.

In early December 2009, after having appeared only in one Copa del Rey match for the Cantabrians, against Real Murcia, his spell at the club also including a demotion to the B team and legal action undertaken by the player, Zé António terminated his link. He returned to his country in January 2010, joining U.D. Leiria on a one-and-a-half-year deal.

Zé António only missed one league game in the 2010–11 season, as Leiria once again managed to retain its top division status. In June 2011 the 34-year-old left the club, returning to action after one year out of football with Porto's reserves in the second tier.

References

External links

1977 births
Living people
People from Torres Vedras
Portuguese footballers
Association football defenders
Primeira Liga players
Liga Portugal 2 players
Segunda Divisão players
S.C.U. Torreense players
FC Porto players
Leça F.C. players
F.C. Alverca players
Varzim S.C. players
Associação Académica de Coimbra – O.A.F. players
U.D. Leiria players
FC Porto B players
Bundesliga players
Borussia Mönchengladbach players
Süper Lig players
Manisaspor footballers
Racing de Santander players
Portugal youth international footballers
Portugal under-21 international footballers
Portuguese expatriate footballers
Expatriate footballers in Germany
Expatriate footballers in Turkey
Expatriate footballers in Spain
Portuguese expatriate sportspeople in Germany
Portuguese expatriate sportspeople in Turkey
Portuguese expatriate sportspeople in Spain
Sportspeople from Lisbon District